The Huansu S2 is a 5-seat Compact SUV produced by Huansu, a sub-brand of BAIC Motor.

Overview 
The Huansu S2 is a 5-seat variant of the Huansu S3 7-seat compact SUV. Both are manufactured by Beiqi Yinxiang Automobile, a joint venture between Beijing Auto (Beiqi) and the Yinxiang Motorcycle Group. It debuted at the 2014 Beijing Auto Show.

Powertrain
The Huansu S2 is powered by a 1.5 liter engine developing 113 hp mated to a 5-speed manual transmission. A 1.8 liter four-cylinder engine with 138hp and 180nm originally only available for the Huansu S3 was added later.

2015 facelift
The Huansu S2 received a facelift for the 2015 model year changing the front fascia design to be more inline with the rest of the Huansu lineup.

References

External links 

 Official Website

Cars introduced in 2014
Compact sport utility vehicles
Rear-wheel-drive vehicles
2010s cars
Cars of China